"Whatever Gets You thru the Night" is a song written by John Lennon, released as a single in 1974 on Apple Records, catalogue number Apple 1874 in the United States and Apple R5998 in the United Kingdom. It peaked at No. 1 on all three record charts: Billboard Hot 100, Cashbox, and Record World, and at No. 36 in the UK. It was the lead single for Lennon's album Walls and Bridges; in the UK the single was released on the same day as the album. "Whatever Gets You thru the Night" was Lennon's only solo No. 1 single in the United States during his lifetime. In Canada, the single spent two weeks at No. 2, and became the 30th biggest hit of 1974.

Writing
The inspiration for the lyrics came from late-night television. In December 2005, May Pang told Radio Times: 'At night [Lennon] loved to channel-surf, and would pick up phrases from all the shows. One time, he was watching Reverend Ike, a famous black evangelist, who was saying, 'Let me tell you guys, it doesn't matter, it's whatever gets you through the night.' John loved it and said, 'I've got to write it down or I'll forget it.' He always kept a pad and pen by the bed. That was the beginning of "Whatever Gets You thru the Night".'

The music was inspired by the No. 1 single at the time, "Rock Your Baby" by George McCrae. Although the released track bears little resemblance, the inspiration is more apparent on the alternative version released on John Lennon Anthology.

Content
The recording featured Elton John on harmony vocals and piano. While in the studio, Elton bet Lennon that the song would top the charts, and such was Lennon's scepticism that Elton secured from him a promise to appear on stage at one of his performances, should the record indeed hit No. 1. When the record did achieve that feat, Lennon appeared at John's Thanksgiving performance at Madison Square Garden on 28 November 1974. It was Lennon's last major concert appearance.

"Whatever Gets You thru the Night" was not Lennon's first choice for a single. It was chosen by Capitol Records vice-president Al Coury, who had recently worked his singles 'magic' with Paul McCartney's album Band on the Run. Lennon created a promotional film for the song, in which he lip-synced the first verse while walking through Manhattan. Yoko Ono later created an alternate video for the song, featuring animations of Lennon's drawings.

In 2007, Yoko Ono granted Amnesty International the opportunity to have a number of bands cover Lennon's solo songbook, which included this song. Los Lonely Boys and Les Trois Accords performed it as the second single from the Instant Karma: The Amnesty International Campaign to Save Darfur album.

The live recording with the Elton John Band was released in 1981 on the EP 28 November 1974. The recording is also available on the box set Lennon (1990) and the 1996 expanded/remastered edition of Elton's album Here and There (1976).

Reception
Melody Maker reviewer Robert Wyatt wrote "Lennon's decided to put out a 'no-nonsense rock single.' Everything's recorded and played with real class – including Junior Walker imitations and the less predictable rhythm banjo...As many people seem to feel that the world needs more no-nonsense rock singles, I expect this'll be very...popular."

Cash Box stated, "The production is excellent and the arrangement is full, using diverse instrumentation. Lennon's lyric as always is catchy and the driving rhythms have this moving up extra fast." Record World called it "an original Lennon tune that should score as his brightest night-light since 'Imagine'" and a "buoyantly abetted sax-filled boogie!"

Chart performance

Weekly charts

Year-end charts

Personnel
The musicians who performed on the original recording were:
John Lennon – lead vocals, guitar
Elton John – harmony vocals, piano, organ
Ken Ascher – clavinet
Jesse Ed Davis – electric guitar
Eddie Mottau – acoustic guitar
Klaus Voormann – bass
Jim Keltner – drums
Arthur Jenkins – percussion
Bobby Keys – tenor saxophone
Ron Aprea – alto saxophone

The musicians who performed on the 1974 live recording largely comprised Elton John's band:
John Lennon – guitar, vocals 
Elton John – harmony vocal, piano 
Davey Johnstone – guitar
Dee Murray – bass
Nigel Olsson – drums
Ray Cooper – percussion
The Muscle Shoals Horns

References

External links
John Lennon – Whatever Gets You Thru The Night at Graham Calkin's Beatles Pages.
 

John Lennon songs
Apple Records singles
1974 singles
Billboard Hot 100 number-one singles
Cashbox number-one singles
Songs written by John Lennon
Song recordings produced by John Lennon
1974 songs
Elton John songs
Plastic Ono Band songs
Songs about nights
Male vocal duets